Harry Heher (March 20, 1889 – October 17, 1972) was a New Jersey Supreme Court Justice and Democratic Party leader.

He was born in 1889 in Trenton, New Jersey to John and Anne (Spelman) Heher. He attended the Cathedral School and Trenton High School, graduating in 1907. As was the practice at the time, he read law with a Trenton lawyer instead of attending law school. He was admitted to the New Jersey bar in 1911.

Heher was active in Democratic politics, serving as chairman of the Mercer County Democratic Committee from 1915 to 1922 and chairman of the New Jersey Democratic State Committee from 1922 to 1932. In 1932 he was appointed by Governor A. Harry Moore as an associate justice of the New Jersey Court of Errors and Appeals, known after 1947 as the New Jersey Supreme Court. He was reappointed to the bench in 1940, 1947, and 1954.

Heher married Anne Egan on August 5, 1925, and they had three sons: Harry Heher, Jr. (b. 1927), John Robert Heher (b. 1930), and Garrett Martin Heher (b. 1935). He died in Lawrenceville, New Jersey in 1972 at the age of 83.

References

External links
Biographical information for Harry Heher from The Political Graveyard

1889 births
1972 deaths
Chairmen of the New Jersey Democratic State Committee
New Jersey lawyers
Justices of the Supreme Court of New Jersey
Politicians from Trenton, New Jersey
Trenton Central High School alumni
20th-century American judges
U.S. state supreme court judges admitted to the practice of law by reading law
20th-century American lawyers